Anjam or Bom is a Madang language spoken in Madang Province, Papua New Guinea.

Other names include Bogadjim, Bogajim, Bogati, and Lalok. It is spoken in villages such as Bogadjim.

Orthography 

Anjam is written in the Latin script. The alphabet has 22 letters.

References

External links
Anjam Organised Phonology Data
Field research on the Anjam language at SIL International
Rosetta Project: Anjam Swadesh list
New Testament in Anjam

Mindjim languages
Languages of Madang Province